Eremophila rhegos is a flowering plant in the figwort family, Scrophulariaceae and is endemic to Western Australia. It is an erect shrub with densely hairy leaves and branches and blue, mauve, purple or white flowers.

Description
The branches and leaves are covered with a dense layer of branched, greyish-white hairs. The branches are thick and rough due to the presence of persistent, raised leaf bases. The leaves are crowded near the ends of the branches, overlapping each other.

The petal tube is deep purple, blue or light lilac-coloured to white on the outside, and white with purple spots inside. The petal tube and lobes are glabrous except for a few hairs around the margins of the lobes and the inside of the tube which is filled with long, soft hairs. The 4 stamens are fully enclosed in the petal tube.

Taxonomy and naming 
This species was first formally described by Robert Chinnock in 2007 and the description was published in Eremophila and Allied Genera: A Monograph of the Plant Family Myoporaceae. The specific epithet (rhegos) is an Ancient Greek word (ῥῆγος) meaning "rug" or "blanket", referring to the dense covering, especially on the branches and sepals.

Distribution and habitat
Eremophila rhegos grows in skeletal soils between Landor Station and Dairy Creek Station in the Gascoyne and Murchison biogeographic regions.

Conservation
This eremophila is classified as "Priority One" by the Western Australian Government Department of Parks and Wildlife, meaning that it is known from only one or a few locations which are potentially at risk.

Use in horticulture
This shrub has not often been grown in gardens and its requirements are not currently well known. It can be propagated from cuttings or by grafting onto Myoporum rootstock. It is growing in full sun in well-drained soil, is drought tolerant and tolerates light frosts.

References

Eudicots of Western Australia
rhegos
Endemic flora of Western Australia
Plants described in 2007
Taxa named by Robert Chinnock